Iruputuncu (possibly from Aymara iru spiny Peruvian feather grass, phutunqu a small vessel or a hole, pit, crater) is a mountain in the Andes in the Cordillera Occidental on the border of Bolivia and Chile. The Chilean side is in the Tarapacá Region, and  the Bolivian side is in the Potosí Department, Daniel Campos Province, Llica Municipality. Iruputuncu is southeast of Mount Candelaria, west of the Salar de Uyuni salt flat and south of the Umani. It is about 4,200 m (13,780 ft) high.

References 

Mountains of Chile
Mountains of Potosí Department
Landforms of Tarapacá Region